The Fremont Municipal Auditorium is a historic building in Fremont, Nebraska. It was built in 1937 with funding from the Public Works Administration, and designed in the Art Deco architectural style. It has been listed on the National Register of Historic Places since July 11, 2002.

References

National Register of Historic Places in Dodge County, Nebraska
Art Deco architecture in Nebraska
Buildings and structures completed in 1937